Paul McIver (born 26 March 1986) is a New Zealand actor and musician. His first film appearance was in the television series The Ray Bradbury Theater. He has appeared in the Hercules: The Legendary Journeys films and the television show as Hercules' son.

Biography
Paul McIver was born 26 March 1986 in Auckland, New Zealand. He began attending auditions at a young age, and when he was six he landed the role of "Saul Affmann" in an episode of The Ray Bradbury Theater. He is mainly known for playing Hercules' son Aeson in two of the television movies and the series.

McIver took a break from acting for ten years, graduating from Avondale College in 2003, and from the University of Auckland in 2007, with a degree in Music and Film. His father is a photographer and his mother an artist; his sister, Rose McIver, is an actress. He married Philippa Moyle in September 2008, and they have two children.

He played Jesse Collins in three episodes of the New Zealand soap opera Shortland Street, and was part of The Owl and the Pussycat, a classical guitar duo, with Michelle Birch.

Filmography

Theatre

References

External links
 

1986 births
Living people
People educated at Avondale College
People from Auckland
New Zealand male film actors
New Zealand male television actors
New Zealand male soap opera actors
New Zealand people of Scottish descent
University of Auckland alumni
20th-century New Zealand male actors
21st-century New Zealand male actors